The 2014–15 season was A.C. Cesena's first season back in Serie A after having been relegated at the end of the 2011–12 season. The team competed in Serie A and the Coppa Italia.

Players
As of 30 May 2015

Competitions

Serie A

League table

Results summary

Results by round

Matches

Coppa Italia

Statistics

Appearances and goals

|-
! colspan=10 style="background:#DCDCDC; text-align:center"| Goalkeepers

|-
! colspan=10 style="background:#DCDCDC; text-align:center"| Defenders

|-
! colspan=10 style="background:#DCDCDC; text-align:center"| Midfielders

|-
! colspan=10 style="background:#DCDCDC; text-align:center"| Forwards

|-
! colspan=10 style="background:#DCDCDC; text-align:center"| Players transferred out during the season

References

Cesena
A.C. Cesena seasons